Martin H. Franzmann (January 29, 1907 – March 28, 1976) was an American Lutheran clergyman and theologian. He was also a college professor and poet who wrote numerous books and hymns.

Early life and education
Martin Hans Franzmann was born in Lake City, Minnesota. He was the son of Rev. William Franzmann (1868–1953) and Else (Griebling) Franzmann (1875–1944). His father was an immigrant from Germany and was a Lutheran minister. Franzmann graduated from Northwestern College before entering Wisconsin Lutheran Seminary. He had also studied at the University of Chicago, but did not earn a degree. He later studied in Greece as a Daniel L. Shorey Traveling Fellow.

Career
In 1936 Franzmann accepted the position to serve as a professor of Greek and English at Northwestern until the summer of 1946. In 1946, he was called to teach at Concordia Seminary in St. Louis, Missouri. In 1957, he became the chairman of Exegetical Theology at Concordia. He was notable for his traditional stance on Biblical inerrancy and inspiration against historical criticism well before the walkout that led to the Seminex crisis.

Among his other position was time as chair of the Synodical Conference, a member of the Commission on Theology and Church Relations of the Lutheran Church–Missouri Synod, and the 1962 LCMS representative to the Lutheran World Federation. He left the faculty of Concordia Seminary in 1969 to become tutor at Westfield House, the theological college of the Evangelical Lutheran Church of England (ELCE), in Cambridge, England.

Personal life 
In 1972 he retired from Westfield House and moved to Wells, England, where he died in 1976. He was succeeded as tutor by his son John Franzmann.

Hymns

Original
In Adam We Have All Been One
Lutheran Book of Worship (Minneapolis: Augsburg Publishing House, 1978), 372.
Lutheran Service Book (St. Louis: Concordia Publishing House, 2006), 569.

O God, O Lord of Heaven and Earth
Lutheran Book of Worship (Minneapolis: Augsburg Publishing House, 1978), 396.
Lutheran Service Book (St. Louis: Concordia Publishing House, 2006), 834.

O Kingly Love
Lutheran Worship (St. Louis: Concordia Publishing House, 1982), 346.

O Thou, Who Hast of Thy Pure Grace
Lutheran Book of Worship (Minneapolis: Augsburg Publishing House, 1978), 442.

Our Paschal Lamb That Sets Us Free
Lutheran Service Book (St. Louis: Concordia Publishing House, 2006), 473.

Preach You the Word
Lutheran Service Book (St. Louis: Concordia Publishing House, 2006), 586.

Thy Strong Word
Lutheran Book of Worship (Minneapolis: Augsburg Publishing House, 1978), 233.
Lutheran Worship (St. Louis: Concordia Publishing House, 1982), 328.
Lutheran Service Book (St. Louis: Concordia Publishing House, 2006), 578.

Translations
With High Delight Let Us Unite; original text: Georg Vetter
Lutheran Book of Worship (Minneapolis: Augsburg Publishing House, 1985), 140.
Lutheran Service Book (St. Louis: Concordia Publishing House, 2006), 483.

Isaiah, Mighty Seer; original text: Martin Luther
Evangelical Lutheran Worship (Minneapolis: Augsburg Fortress, 2006).
Lutheran Book of Worship (Minneapolis: Augsburg Publishing House, 1985), 528.
The Lutheran Hymnal (St. Louis: Concordia Publishing House, 1941), 249.

Rise Again, Ye Lion-Hearted; original text: unknown
The Lutheran Hymnal (St. Louis: Concordia Publishing House, 1941), 470.

Books
  "Follow Me: Discipleship According to Matthew"; Concordia Publishing House, 1961. .
  "Concordia Commentary: Romans"; Concordia Publishing House, 1968. .
  "Pray For Joy"; Concordia Publishing House, 1970. .
  "Concordia Study Bible with Notes"; William Collins Sons & Co., Ltd., for Concordia Publishing House, 1971. .
  "The Word of the Lord Grows"; Concordia Publishing House, 1972. .
  "The Revelation to John: A Commentary"; Concordia Publishing House, 1986. .
  "Ha! Ha! Among the Trumpets"; Concordia Publishing House, 1994. .

References

Further reading 
 Brinkley, Richard N. (1993) Thy Strong Word: The Enduring Legacy of Martin Franzmann (Concordia Publishing House) 
 Leaver, Robin A. (1994) Come to the Feast: The Original and Translated Hymns of Martin H. Franzmann (MorningStar) 

1907 births
1976 deaths
20th-century American Lutheran clergy
American Lutheran theologians
American religion academics
American religious writers
Bible commentators
Lutheran Church–Missouri Synod people
American Lutheran hymnwriters
20th-century American non-fiction writers
Lutheran biblical scholars